Sarah Christine Roemer Murray (born August 28, 1984) is an American actress and model. One of her best-known roles was a supporting character in Disturbia, and she has also starred in a number of films including Asylum, Hachi: A Dog's Tale, Fired Up!, Waking Madison, and The Con Artist, as well as the television series The Event and Chosen.

Early life
Roemer was born on August 28, 1984 in San Diego, California. At the age of 15 she was recruited by a modeling agency while at 7-Eleven. She attended Horizon Junior and Senior High School and relocated to Los Angeles and started her modeling career.

Career 
Roemer signed with ID Model Management in New York City. She has modeled for GQ, Cosmopolitan, Maxim, Esquire, Nylon Guys, Self, Interview, Flaunt. She was featured in the Sportswear International magazine's cover model in its summer 2004 issue.

Her first part was in an indie film called Wristcutters: A Love Story. In the 2006 horror film The Grudge 2 she portrays Lacey Kimble, a high school student and young cheerleader. Released on October 13, 2006, to negative reviews, the film was a box office success. In 2007, Roemer starred alongside Shia LaBeouf in the Paramount Pictures thriller film Disturbia. She portrayed Ashley Carlson, a love interest and neighbor of LaBeouf's character. Disturbia was released on April 13, 2007, to a positive critical reception and debuting at number one in its first week at the box office. The film grossed $117.8 million against a budget of $20 million. She also starred alongside Dakota Fanning, Kristen Stewart and Virginia Madsen in the Kate Hudson–directed short film Cutlass.

In 2008, she starred alongside Travis Van Winkle and Ellen Hollman in Asylum. Directed by David Ellis, who also directed Final Destination 2, the film was released straight-to-DVD on July 15, 2008. A year later, Roemer appeared in the 2009 teen comedy film Fired Up. Also in 2009, Roemer portrayed Andy Wilson, the daughter of Richard Gere's character Parker Wilson, in the American drama film Hachi: A Dog's Tale. An American adaptation of the 1987 Japanese film Hachikō Monogatari, the film opened to positive critical reception and enjoyed worldwide box office success. In 2009, she also starred in the independent film Falling Up, which was released to mixed reviews and released straight-to-DVD. Roemer appeared in the music video for "Come Back to Me" by American Idol contestant David Cook.

On September 11, 2010, she starred in the independent thriller film Locked In, portraying Emma Sawyer. She also served as an associate producer in the film. Roemer portrayed central character Madison Walker in the independent drama Waking Madison, which was released straight-to-DVD on July 12, 2011. She also appeared as Kristen in the 2010 independent romantic comedy film The Con Artist.

Later that year, Roemer starred in the NBC drama series The Event, portraying Leila Buchanan. The series concluded on May 13, 2011.

Personal life
Roemer began dating her Chosen co-star Chad Michael Murray in 2014. In January 2015, it was announced that she and Murray had married. They have a son born in 2015, and a daughter, born 2017.

Filmography

Film

Television

References

External links
 
 Sarah Roemer Biography

1984 births
American female models
American film actresses
American television actresses
Female models from California
Living people
Actresses from San Diego
21st-century American actresses